

Births in 2018 by race/ethnicity

Notes
Data are by place of residence. Data reflect race and Latino origin of the infant's mother. Race and Latino origin are reported separately on birth certificates; persons of Latino origin may be of any race. In this table, non-Latino women are classified by race. Race categories are consistent with the 1997 Office of Management and Budget standards. Single race is defined as only one race reported on the birth certificate.

See also
Demography of the United States

References

Demographics of the United States